Katsuno is a Japanese surname. Notable people with the surname include:

, Japanese baseball player
, Japanese actor

See also
Katsuno Station, a railway station in Kotake, Kurate District, Fukuoka Prefecture, Japan
9067 Katsuno, a main-belt asteroid

Japanese-language surnames